"Ticking Time Bomb" is a single by the industrial hip-hop group Tackhead, released in March 1989 on World Records.

Formats and track listing 
All songs written by Keith LeBlanc, Skip McDonald, Adrian Sherwood and Doug Wimbish
UK 12" single (WR012)
"Ticking Time Bomb" – 2:50
"Ticking Time Bomb (dub version)" – 6:18
"Body to Burn" – 3:09

Personnel 

Tackhead
Keith LeBlanc – drums, percussion
Skip McDonald – guitar
Adrian Sherwood – sampler, programming
Doug Wimbish – bass guitar

Technical personnel
Jill Mumford – design
Tackhead – producer

Charts

References

External links 
 

1989 songs
1989 singles
Song recordings produced by Adrian Sherwood
Tackhead songs
Songs written by Doug Wimbish